Jaidon Kya Denley Anthony (born 1 December 1999) is an English professional footballer who plays as a winger for  club AFC Bournemouth.

Club career

Early career
Born in Hackney, London, Anthony spent ten years in Arsenal's academy, alongside the likes of Emile Smith Rowe and Reiss Nelson, before joining AFC Bournemouth in 2016 after a successful trial period.

AFC Bournemouth
On 31 January 2020, Anthony joined National League South side Weymouth on loan for the remainder of the season. He made his debut for the Terras in a 5–1 win over Maidstone United on 29 February 2020 and scored the first and only goal of his brief loan spell in a 3–2 win over Dorking Wanderers on 25 July 2020.

Anthony made his debut for the Cherries on 2 December 2020 against Preston North End at the Vitality Stadium, where he assisted a goal for Sam Surridge in a 2–3 loss for the Cherries. On 31 July 2021, Anthony made his first competitive start for AFC Bournemouth in the club's 5–0 win over Milton Keynes Dons in the EFL Cup.

First team breakthrough
On 6 August 2021, Anthony made his first league start for AFC Bournemouth in their 2–2 draw with West Bromwich Albion in the Championship, where he also grabbed an assist. Anthony started the next league game against Nottingham Forest, grabbing another assist in a 1–2 victory for the Cherries. Bournemouth manager Scott Parker commented on Anthony that "He's shown good quality...he’s got his opportunity and at this present moment he’s taken it...Every bit of me suggests that this boy has got a key role to play this year". He scored his first goal for Bournemouth in a 2–0 win at Birmingham City on 18 August 2021.

Anthony continued a strong start to the season by winning the club’s player of the month award for November, scoring four goals and getting one assist during this period. For his performances, Anthony was also nominated as the EFL Championship Player of the Month for November, losing out to Chris Willock of Queens Park Rangers.

Career statistics

Honours
AFC Bournemouth
Championship runner-up: 2021–22

References

External links
Profile at the AFC Bournemouth website

1999 births
Living people
Footballers from Greater London
English footballers
Association football forwards
Arsenal F.C. players
AFC Bournemouth players
Weymouth F.C. players
Premier League players
English Football League players
National League (English football) players
Black British sportsmen
English people of Jamaican descent